Manna Glacier is a broad depression-glacier located north of Stevenson Bluff and Mount Steele in the Wilson Hills of Antarctica. It drains northeastward into the eastern part of the Gillett Ice Shelf. The glacier was so named by the northern party of the New Zealand Geological Survey Antarctic Expedition, 1963–64, because of an airdrop of extra comforts from an aircraft which carried the Governor-General of New Zealand over this area was like "manna from heaven".

References

Glaciers of Oates Land